Felix Friedrich (born in 1945) is a German organist, church musician and musicologist.

Life 
Friedrich was born in 1945 in Hochweitzschen near Döbeln. He studied church music and organ in Dresden and Weimar. An extensive concert activity led him so far into all European countries as well as into the former USSR and into the USA. He has performed with great success at international music festivals: Salzburg Festival, International Congress of Organists in Cambridge, AGO-Convention Detroit among others.

Numerous radio, television and disc recordings were produced with him. So far he has released over 80 CDs. He is particularly committed to Neue Musik and has given over 50 world premieres. As a soloist he regularly performs with major orchestras and conductors (among others Marek Janowski, Fabio Luisi, Kurt Masur, Helmuth Rilling, Peter Schreier).

In 1987 he received his doctorate from the Martin Luther University of Halle-Wittenberg. Musicological work is an important part of his artistic work. Since 1991 he has been the director of the "Thüringische Orgelakademie". For the CD edition of all organs by Gottfried Silbermann he was awarded the Annual Prize of the German Record Critics 2003 and in 2006 the Culture Prize of the City of Altenburg together with Klaus-Jürgen Kamprad's querstand publishing house.

Publications 
 Der Orgelbauer Heinrich Gottfried Trost. Wiesbaden 1989.
 Johann Ludwig Krebs. Leben und Werk. Altenburg 1988.
 Die Orgel im Exlibris. Altenburg 2002
 Orgeln im Altenburger Land. Altenburg 1994
 Thematisch-systematisches Verzeichnis der musikalischen Werke von Johann Ludwig Krebs (Krebs-WV). Altenburg 2009
 Felix Friedrich an den Orgeln in Bad Lausick, Rötha/St. Marien, Schweikershain und Glauchau.
 Numerous articles in MGG und New Grove

Annotated editions 
 Charles-Marie Widor: Symphonie Gothique for organ, Six Duos for organ and piano, Variations de Concert sur un thème original for piano. Schott Music Mainz.
 Bedřich Smetana: Organ works. Dr. J. Butz-Musikverlag Bonn.
 Johann Ludwig Krebs, organ, piano and chamber music. Carus-Verlag Stuttgart and Noetzel-Verlag Wilhelmshaven.
 Ottorino Respighi: Suite for organ and orchestra. Dr. J. Butz-Musikverlag Bonn.
 B-A-C-H - Fugues for organ from the late 18th century. Dr. J. Butz-Musikverlag Bonn.
 Johann Pachelbel: Organ works. Schott Music Mainz.

Recordings 
 Silbermann organs in Vogtland - Mylau and Reichenbach. Motet Ursina
 Johann Ludwig Krebs: Organ Works. Berlin Classics
 Johann Sebastian Bach: Organ works. Capriccio/Delta
 Johann Sebastian Bach: Clavier- Practice Part III Motette Ursina
 Edvard Grieg. Peer Gynt. Philips
 Johann Ludwig Krebs: Complete works for organ. 11 CD. (querstand)
 New organ music from Scandinavia and Central Europe. querstand
 Musical instruments in Bachhaus Eisenach. Aarton
 The organs of Tobias Heinrich Gottfried Trost. crosswise
 The organs of Zacharias Hildebrandt. crosswise
 Organ and piano, organ and orchestra. (querstand)
 Siegfried Steinkogler: Organ Works. ORF

World premieres 
 Howard Arman: Seine Linke liegt unter meiner Schulter
 Henry Berthold: Concerto for organ and orchestra
 Jean-Luc Darbellay: Cantus for horn and organ
 Jörg Herchet: orgelkomposition 4
 Kurt A. Hueber: Memento mori
 Georg Katzer: Missa profana for organ and Sound house for orchestra and organ
 Maximilian Kreuz: Kyrie eleison und Agnus Dei
 Achim Müller-Weinberg: Warten auf G.... concert for organ and Orchestra
 Friedrich Schenker: Michelangelo-Sinfonie for choir, orchestra, speaker and organ
 Siegfried Thiele: Suite for organ
 Karl Ottomar Treibmann: Trostmusik
 Günther Witschurke: Hommage à Johann Ludwig Krebs
 Ruth Zechlin: Verkündigung

References

External links 
 
 Offizielle Website von Felix Friedrich
 Krebs

German classical organists
20th-century German musicologists
1945 births
Living people
People from Döbeln